The southeast Australian foehn is a westerly foehn wind and a rain shadow effect that usually occurs on the coastal plain of southern New South Wales, and as well as in southeastern Victoria and eastern Tasmania, on the leeward side of the Great Dividing Range. Ranging from cool to hot (depending on the season), the effect occurs when westerly winds descend steeply from the Great Dividing Range onto the coastal slopes, whereby causing major adiabatic compression (which is the rate at which temperature decreases with altitude) and a substantial loss of moisture. 

The effect is known by other names, such as the Australian chinook, the Great Dividing wind, the Great Dividing foehn or simply westerly foehn. The southeast Australian foehn is distinguished by three criteria; surface winds which blow from the mountains' direction, a sharp rise in air temperature in the leeward side of the mountains, and an accompanying diminution in atmospheric moisture. 

Typically occurring from late autumn to spring, though not completely unheard of in the summer (particularly in eastern Tasmania), the Great Dividing foehn mainly occurs when a westerly or southwesterly frontal system (including a general westerly flow) passes over the ranges, thereby providing clear to partly cloudy and relatively warmer conditions on the lee.

Origins

Foehn occurrence in southeastern Australia is mostly linked with the passage of a deep low pressure system or westerly cold fronts across the Great Australian Bight and southeastern Australia that cause strong winds to reorient virtually perpendicular to some parts of the Great Dividing Range, predominantly between late autumn into winter and spring, particularly during a negative SAM phase. Their occurrence is owed to the incomplete orographic blocking of comparatively moist low-level air and the subsidence of drier upper-level air in the lee of the mountains. The foehn effect on the southeast coastal plains can occur when hot, northwesterly winds blow from the interior (even when there is little moisture on the windward side), because the air heats up faster as it descends into the plains than it cooled as it ascended the ranges. 

Moreover, temperatures on the lee of the Great Dividing Range tend to rise substantially (due to a katabatic effect) when westerly cold fronts passing over southern Australia push warm and dry air from the desert across the country's eastern states and over the Range (this is generally followed by a southerly buster). 

As such, the Great Dividing foehn is one the few reasons why Sydney, among other places on the coastal plain, registers high temperatures in the warm season but seldom attains cold maximum temperatures in the winter. Furthermore, when the warm season northwesterly winds strike (such as the Brickfielder), the hottest and driest areas of southeastern Australia will generally be located along the southern coastal region of NSW in the lee of the Great Dividing range and coastal escarpment due to the foehn effect. Much lower relative humidity figures would also observed in these leeward stations.

Formation

As the moist air rises over the windward side of the ranges, it cools and it would condense, thereby creating precipitation on the upwind slopes. The precipitation then gets rid of the moisture from the air mass on the lee side of the ranges, and the condensation raises the air temperature as it descends the lee slopes towards the coastal plains because of the adiabatic compression. 

During these conditions, an orographic cloud band, or the Föhn wall, builds up along the ridgelines of the southeastern highlands due to condensation of moisture as the air ascends the windward slopes. Meanwhile, the Föhn arch, with its broad layer of altostratus cloud, shapes downwind of the mountains in the ascending component of a standing lee mountain wave. In weather maps, a band of clear air called the Föhn gap, which is over the downwind of the Great Dividing region, can be seen between the wall and arched cloud cover. This foehn wind can be referred to as thermodynamically driven.

The existence of topographically induced atmospheric waves in connection with foehn occurrence has been indicated, which develop with the descent of upper-level air above of the ridgetop and pass into the lee of the ranges as broad-scale, vertically supporting gravity waves. The wind shears and the strength of the downslope motion manifested in the model examination also point that the onslaught of foehn conditions results in increased turbulence near the surface, evident in the gusty conditions observed at the lee stations. In addition to the foehn winds, the same westerly winds also ward off the cooling sea breezes that arrive from the northeast, thereby preventing them from developing in the eastern seaboard. 

A vertically propagating gravity wave over the affected region exists. The descending motion over the coastal escarpment is stronger than that over the primary range and is connected with more powerful shear. The downslope winds tend to be strong, particularly near the lee's surface of the coastal escarpment. Smaller-scale, trapped lee waves over the affected region exist, and their incidence, together with the strong wind shears, signal significant turbulence throughout the boundary layer, which is concordant with the heavy gusty surface winds registered on the leeside. At nighttime, the foehn effect subsides due to a mountain breeze – This is when denser cool air flows down the mountain slopes to settle in the downwind side, thereby providing relatively cold conditions in the night and, consequently, a high diurnal range of temperature.

Occurrence

The Great Dividing foehn is primarily observed in the southeast of New South Wales, east of the Great Dividing Range, in places such as the Sydney metropolitan area (Cumberland Plain), the Illawarra, some areas of the Southern Highlands, parts of the Monaro region, and the South Coast.  It can also occur in the Central Coast, Hunter Valley and the Mid North Coast to the north. In many instances, it is observed in the East Gippsland region in Victoria as well as the eastern portion of Tasmania to the south. 

Foehn winds may also impact other parts of Australia, such as east of the Great Dividing Range in southeast Queensland and northern New South Wales. The Great Dividing foehn does not heavily impact areas northwards from the Central Coast. The effect is gradient; being more common and efficacious towards the South Coast (due to the latter region being in the track of prevailing westerlies, which exponentially falters north of 34.5° S).  

With leeward areas, or areas that receive foehn winds, precipitation is predominantly derived from the Tasman Sea to the east, since the Great Dividing Range blocks westerly cold fronts from the Southern Ocean (which tend to arrive between winter and early spring). Therefore, due to the foehn effect, winters in leeward zones are drier with the summers being relatively wet, unlike those in the windward side which, conversely, have drier summers and damp winters.

Regions

From north to south, the westerly foehn mostly affects areas that lie to the east of the Great Dividing Range (the southeast coastal plains); Gosford, Sydney, Wollongong, Nowra, Ulladulla, Moruya, Batemans Bay, Narooma, Bega, and Merimbula (all of which are leeward). Further inland, in the Blue Mountains, Springwood and Katoomba would also experience foehn winds. The foehn effect is frequently observed in the Monaro region to the south, in places such as Bombala, Nimmitabel and particularly Cooma. When a vigorous cold front consumes the state of New South Wales, foehn winds would occur in the Hunter Valley in places like Newcastle to Maitland, and the mid-north coast in places such as Taree, Port Macquarie and Coffs Harbour.

Areas such as Lithgow and Mount Boyce in the Blue Mountains; Braidwood, Canberra, Goulburn, Bowral and Moss Vale in around the Southern Highlands and Tablelands, and Delegate on the southern face of the ranges can occasionally receive foehn winds as they lie in a transitional zone, though they are at times exposed to westerly or southwesterly systems as isolated frontal rainbands pass over the ranges. When these areas observe foehn winds, they are inclined to have more cloud cover (including wave clouds) than those on the coastal plain to the east. 

In the East Gippsland region of Victoria, predominantly leeward areas include Omeo, Bairnsdale, Orbost and Mallacoota, although like the above areas they can occasionally be exposed to vigorous southwesterly systems and would experience light precipitation from westerly rain bands in some instances. The port of Sale is intermediate, making it leeward at times, but also windward on some occasions.

In Tasmania, Hobart, New Norfolk, Scamander, Swansea and St Helens on the east coast; as well as Oatlands, Ouse and Bothwell in the Midlands, are downwind of the Central Highlands, thereby usually receiving foehn winds (particularly in the warm season, though sporadically throughout the year). 

Areas that lie to the west of the Great Dividing Range are windward and therefore never experience a foehn effect under a westerly stream, with persistent cloud cover. On the contrary, the Great Dividing Range also blocks Tasman weather systems, such as East coast lows as well as southerly fronts. When southerly or easterly systems lift over the coastal slopes, the western edge of the Range would, conversely, experience foehn-like winds.

Effects
The Great Dividing wind can be particularly damaging to homes and would affect flights, in addition to being uncomfortable, as the wind chill factor would usually make the temperatures feel cooler than what they are. The Australian foehn has also impacted international sporting events and as well as recreational aviation, such as in 2007, when a light aircraft crashed in the Central Highlands due to severe winds on a region that is prone to mountain-wind waves.  Much like the Santa Ana winds in California, they may elevate fire danger in the warmer months due to their dry, gusty nature. 

Foehn winds in general have been linked to headaches, depression and as well as suicide contemplation, although this study has not been proven. Though recent studies regarding migraine attacks during Chinook winds suggest there may be some truth in it.

Notable observations

 28 May 2000 was a striking example of the 'divided' weather between the western and eastern faces of the range. On the western face, Hunters Hill in Victoria registered a maximum temperature of just , whereas Cooma Airport on the eastern face reached .
The elevated temperatures again coexisted with the inflow of significantly drier air. Simultaneously, the leeward stations in the southern New South Wales coast showed a sharp increase in temperature (9°C in 2 hours) and a decrease in relative humidity. Similar warming and drying were also observed further inland at Cooma, Braidwood, Canberra, and Bombala. 
 On 29 May 2007, it was observed that the temperature at Sale (leeward side) was around  higher than the corresponding temperatures at Melbourne and Wangaratta (which lie on the upwind side). Furthermore, the relative humidity was 31% at Sale and as high as 80%–90% at Melbourne and Wangaratta.
 On 2 April 2008, maximum temperatures on the Gippsland coast coexisted with peak wind speeds from the northwest that gusted to 75 km/h. Temperatures at Bairnsdale, Latrobe Valley, and Nowa Nowa were 2°–4°C higher than average, with reductions in relative humidity also being observed. 
On 28 April 2008, predominant winds were mainly westerly with the hottest and driest areas of southeastern Australia located along the coastal fringe of southern New South Wales, in the lee of the Great Dividing Range. Temperatures on the windward side of the mountains reached at about 8°C below average, while in the lee temperature peaked at only about 1°–2°C below average, therefore indicating a positive anomaly of about 6°–7°C.  
On the evening of 18 September 2008, temperatures at Mount Nowa Nowa and Bairnsdale rose after sunset, while relative humidity displayed complemental behavior during the course of the night. On 19 September, the relatively warm and dry conditions prevailed along the Gippsland coast, in contrast to upwind conditions.
 On 27 October 2008, foehn wind dynamics were observed over the Gippsland region to the southeast of the Australian Capital Territory on the lee of the ranges, associated with northwesterly winds over southern New South Wales. These downwind regions experienced lower humidity levels and higher than average temperatures. Similar but less pronounced effects were also observed in Green Cape, Bombala, and Cooma.
 On 18 July 2016, Mallacoota reached an unseasonable high of  due to the foehn effect, a record warm winter day for that region in Victoria.

See also
Brickfielder
Zonda wind
Nor'west arch

Notes

References

External links
Foehn effect in Australia explained on YouTube
Foehn effect observation in the Southeast on YouTube

Winds
Geography of Australia
Climate of Australia
Föhn effect
Geography of New South Wales
Weather events in Australia
Coastline of New South Wales
Coastline of Tasmania
Great Dividing Range